Platytarus is a genus of beetles in the family Carabidae, containing the following species:

 Platytarus boysii (Chaudoir, 1850) 
 Platytarus bucculentus Andrewes, 1935 
 Platytarus bufo Fabricius, 1801
 Platytarus compsus Andrewes, 1936 
 Platytarus congobelgicus Basilewsky, 1961 
 Platytarus dicraeus Andrewes, 1935 
 Platytarus faminii (Dejean, 1826)
 Platytarus gracilis (Dejean, 1831)
 Platytarus planulatus (Bates, 1892) 
 Platytarus porcatus Andrewes, 1923 
 Platytarus reichei Chaudoir, 1875 
 Platytarus tesselatus (Dejean, 1831)

References

Lebiinae